"How Come" is a song by the American rap group D12. It was released in June 2004 as the second single from their second album D12 World.  The song was certified Gold by the RIAA.

This was the last officially D12 released single before Proof died in 2006.

Content
The song is about the relationship between the members of D12. Eminem makes reference to his relationship to Proof, Kon Artis talks about Eminem and Kim's relationship, and Proof talks about the rift between him and Eminem.

Bizarre and Swift had verses in the extended version, but these were cut from the official release of the song.

Music video
The video depicts members of D12 fighting with Eminem in the Shady Records studio. It shows a detailed strain on the members relationships. They discuss how Eminem rose to stardom, and they can't get a deal. They envy Eminem, but he doesn't think there is anything to envy, the song ends, leaving people wondering, with the members dissatisfied. In the second verse of the song, Kon Artis talks about a time when he claims to have seen Eminem's girlfriend Kim cheating on him. The video ends with a clip of another song from D12 World, "Git Up". The beginning also shows a home video of Eminem rapping at an underground show with Proof and Bizarre.

The accompanying music video for this single is known as "How Come Plus Git Up" and was released in 2004.

Track listing
 UK CD single

 European CD single

Charts

Weekly charts

Year-end charts

Certifications

Cover
A cover version was first performed by English rock band Embrace for BBC Radio 1's Live Lounge show. This version is shortened to Eminem's lyrics on the song, cutting out Kon Artis and Proof. The song was released B-sides to their single "Ashes" and on their album Dry Kids: B-Sides 1997–2005. When the video is played for this song, the song often joins onto a shortened version of the D12 song, "Git Up."

Release history

References

External links

D12 songs
2004 singles
Songs written by Eminem
2004 songs
Shady Records singles
Songs written by Denaun Porter